Idris Sultan (born January 28, 1993) is a Tanzanian actor, comedian, and radio host who won the Big Brother Africa-Hotshots in 2014. Sultan also hosted a comedy news show called Sio Habari and regularly hosts his own stand-up comedy shows. In 2016, he also hosted a radio show called MwB (Mji wa Burudani) on "ChoiceFM Tanzania".

Idris Sultan is also the first Tanzanian actor to be featured in a film streaming on Netflix, titled "Slay" (2021).

Awards & Nominations

References

External links
 

1993 births
Living people
Male comedians
Tanzanian male actors
Tanzanian radio people
21st-century comedians
21st-century male actors
21st-century Tanzanian actors